The women's tournament of the 2016 FIBA 3x3 World Championships hosted in China was contested by 20 teams.

Participating teams
Every FIBA zone except FIBA Africa were represented. The top 20 teams, including the hosts, based on the FIBA National Federation ranking qualified for the tournament.

The pools for the tournament were unveiled on 20 September 2016.

FIBA Asia (5)
  (12) (hosts)
  (18)
  (15)
  (11)
  (20)

FIBA Africa (0)
 None

FIBA Oceania (3)
  (17)
  (19)
  (16)

FIBA Americas (2)
  (10)
  (14)

FIBA Europe (10)
  (7)
  (5)
  (4)
  (2)
  (3)
  (1)
  (9)
  (13)
  (6)
  (8)

Main tournament

Preliminary round

Group A

Group B

Group C

Group D

Knockout stage

Final standings

Awards

References

External links
Official website

2016
Women
2016 in women's basketball
2016 in Chinese women's sport
International women's basketball competitions hosted by China